Pingasa is a genus of moths in the family Geometridae first described by Frederic Moore in 1887.

Species
Pingasa abyssiniaria (Guenée, [1858])
Pingasa abyssiniaria abyssiniaria (Guenée, [1858])
Pingasa abyssiniaria rufata D. S. Fletcher, 1956
Pingasa aigneri Prout, 1930
Pingasa aigneri aigneri Prout, 1930
Pingasa aigneri pallida Yazaki, 1995
Pingasa alba C. Swinhoe, 1891
Pingasa alba alba C. Swinhoe, 1891
Pingasa alba albida (Oberthür, 1913)
Pingasa alba brunnescens Prout, 1913
Pingasa angulifera Warren, 1896 (=Pingasa atriscripta Warren, 1899, Hypochroma munita Lucas, 1901)
Pingasa aravensis Prout, 1916
Pingasa atropa Prout, 1935
Pingasa blanda (Pagenstecher, 1900) (=Pingasa acutangula Warren, 1903)
Pingasa chlora (Stoll, 1782)
Pingasa chlora chlora (Stoll, 1782) (=Hypochroma chloraria Guenée, [1858], Pseudoterpna ecchloraria Hübner, [1823], Pingasa latifascia Warren, 1894, Hypochroma paulinaria Pagenstecher, 1885)
Pingasa chlora candidaria Warren, 1894
Pingasa chlora subdentata Warren, 1894
Pingasa chlora sublimbata (Butler, 1882)
Pingasa chloroides Galsworthy, 1998
Pingasa cinerea Warren, 1894 (=Pseudoterpna singularis Kershaw, 1897, Skorpisthes undascripta Lucas, 1900)
Pingasa cornivalva Wiltshire, 1982
Pingasa crenaria (Guenée, [1858]) (=Hypochroma distenta Walker, 1860, Boarmia leucostigmaria Nietner, 1861)
Pingasa decristata Warren, 1902
Pingasa dispensata (Walker, 1860)
Pingasa dispensata dispensata (Walker, 1860)
Pingasa dispensata celata (Walker, 1866)
Pingasa dispensata delotypa Prout, 1935
Pingasa distensaria (Walker, 1860)
Pingasa distensaria distensaria (Walker, 1860)
Pingasa distensaria respondens (Walker, 1860)
Pingasa elutriata Prout, 1916
Pingasa floridivenis Prout, 1920
Pingasa grandidieri (Butler, 1879) (=Hypochroma eugrapharia Mabille, 1880)
Pingasa griveaudi Herbulot, 1966
Pingasa griveaudi griveaudi Herbulot, 1966
Pingasa griveaudi vinosa Herbulot, 1985
Pingasa herbuloti Viette, 1971
Pingasa hypoleucaria (Guenée, 1862)
Pingasa hypoleucaria hypoleucaria (Guenée, 1862) (=Hypochroma borbonisaria Oberthür, 1913)
Pingasa hypoleucaria rhodozona de Joannis, 1932
Pingasa hypoxantha Prout, 1916
Pingasa hypoxantha hypoxantha Prout, 1916
Pingasa hypoxantha holochroa Prout, 1916
Pingasa javensis Warren, 1894 (=Pingasa chlora lombokensis Prout, 1927)
Pingasa lahayei (Oberthür, 1887)
Pingasa lahayei lahayei (Oberthür, 1887)
Pingasa lahayei austrina Prout, 1917
Pingasa lariaria (Walker, 1860) (=Hypochroma irrorataria (Moore, 1868))
Pingasa manilensis Prout, 1916
Pingasa meeki Warren, 1907
Pingasa multispurcata Prout, 1913
Pingasa murphyi Herbulot, 1994
Pingasa nigrolineata Karisch, 2006
Pingasa nobilis Prout, 1913
Pingasa nobilis nobilis Prout, 1913
Pingasa nobilis furvifrons Prout, 1927
Pingasa pallidata (de Joannis, 1913)
Pingasa pauciflavata Prout, 1927
Pingasa porphyrochrostes Prout, 1922
Pingasa pseudoterpnaria (Guenée, [1858])
Pingasa pseudoterpnaria pseudoterpnaria (Guenée, [1858]) (=Hypochroma pryeri Bulter, 1878)
Pingasa pseudoterpnaria gracilis Prout, 1916
Pingasa pseudoterpnaria tephrosiaria (Guenée, [1858])
Pingasa rhadamaria (Guenée, [1858])
Pingasa rhadamaria rhadamaria (Guenée, [1858])
Pingasa rhadamaria alterata (Walker, 1860)
Pingasa rhadamaria attenuans (Walker, 1860)
Pingasa rhadamaria signifrontaria (Mabille, 1893)
Pingasa rhadamaria victoria Prout, 1913
Pingasa rubicunda Warren, 1894
Pingasa rubimontana Holloway & Sommerer, 1984
Pingasa rufofasciata Moore, 1888
Pingasa ruginaria (Guenée, [1858])
Pingasa ruginaria ruginaria (Guenée, [1858]) (=Hypochroma nyctemerata Walker, 1860, Hypochroma perfectaria Walker, 1860)
Pingasa ruginaria andamanica Prout, 1916
Pingasa ruginaria communicans (Walker, 1860)
Pingasa ruginaria commutata (Walker, 1860) (=Hypochroma batiaria Plötz, 1880)
Pingasa ruginaria interrupta Warren, 1901
Pingasa ruginaria pacifica Inoue, 1964
Pingasa secreta Inoue, 1986
Pingasa serrativalvis Herbulot, 2000
Pingasa subpurpurea Warren, 1897
Pingasa subviridis Warren, 1896
Pingasa tapungkanana (Strand, 1910)
Pingasa ultrata Herbulot, 1966
Pingasa venusta Warren, 1894

References

 Galsworthy, A.C., 1998: A new species of Pingasa (Lepidoptera, Geometridae, Geometrinae) from Hong Kong. Transactions of the Lepidopterological Society of Japan 49 (2): 104–106. Full article: .
 Karisch, Timm, 2006, Eine neue Pingasa art vom Mt. Cameroun (Lepidoptera: Geometridae: Geometrinae). Entomofauna 27 (31): 385–392.

External links

Pseudoterpnini